The Sandy Creek is a tidal creek in North Andros, In the Bahamas.  It is located northwest of Andros Town and southeast of Owens Town, near Stafford and Staniard Creeks.

See also
List of rivers of the Bahamas

References

Rivers of the Bahamas